Seasons in the Sun is the debut studio album by Canadian musician Terry Jacks. The album, which was released by Bell Records in 1974, features Jacks' only hit single, "Seasons in the Sun", which reached no. 1 in over 12 countries.

Track listing

Charts

References

1974 albums
Bell Records albums
1974 debut albums